William Noye (1814 – 1 November 1872) was an English amateur entomologist and his paper on insects found in the Land's End district was the first published account of the Cornish Lepidoptera.

List of publications 
 Noye, W. (1846) "List of Insects (Lepidoptera) found in the district of the Land's End". Transactions of the Natural History and Antiquarian Society of Penzance. 1: 90–94.
 Noye, W. (1846) "Observations on the Death's-head Moth (Acherontia atropos)". Transactions of the Natural History and Antiquarian Society of Penzance. 1: 122.
 Noye, W. (1846) "Capture of Acherontia atropos at Land's End 28.4.1846". Zoologist. 4: 1345.
 Noye, W. (1847) "Lists of Insects (Lepidoptera) found in the district of the Land's End". Transactions of the Natural History and Antiquarian Society of Penzance. 1: 164–168.
 Noye, W. (1848) "Lists of Insects (Lepidoptera) found in the district of the Land's End". Transactions of the Natural History and Antiquarian Society of Penzance.  1: 203–210.

See also

 Penzance Natural History and Antiquarian Society
 List of people from Cornwall

References

External links 
 Penzance Natural History and Antiquarian Society

1814 births
1872 deaths
People from Paul, Cornwall
19th-century British zoologists
English lepidopterists
Scientists from Cornwall
Australian people of Cornish descent
British emigrants to Australia
Australian lepidopterists
19th-century Australian zoologists